This is a list of women artists who were born in Lithuania or whose artworks are closely associated with that country.

B
Gintautėlė Laimutė Baginskienė (born 1940), painter
Marija Bankauskaitė (1933–1992), ceramist
Angelina Banytė (born 1949), painter
Danguolė Brogienė (born 1959), textile designer

D
Viktorija Daniliauskaitė (born 1951), printmaker, illustrator
Zinaida Irutė Dargienė (born 1936), textile artist
Gražina Degutytė-Švažienė (born 1938), ceramist
Dalia Dokšaitė (born 1955), painter

E
Danutė Eidukaitė (1929–1995), ceramist

G
Aldona Gustas (born 1932), poet, illustrator, now in Germany

H
Lena Himmelstein (1877–1951), Lithuanian-born American clothing designer

J
Lilija Eugenija Jasiūnaitė (born 1944), painter, textile artist
Ramutė Aleksandra Jasudytė (born 1930), textile artist
Rūta Jokubonienė (1930–2010), textile artist
Aldona Jonuškaitė-Šaltenienė (born 1943), ceramist
Virginija Juršienė (born 1950), ceramist

K
Virginija Kalinauskaitė (born 1957), graphic artist
Zinaida Kalpokovaitė-Vogėlienė (born 1941), textile artist
Viktorija Karatajūtė-Šarauskienė (1948–2007), ceramist
Ramunė Kmieliauskaitė (1960–2020), graphic artist, painter
Lolita Kreivaitienė (born 1960), designer
Zita Kreivytė (born 1942), fashion designer, painter
Elvyra Katalina Kriaučiūnaitė (born 1942), Argentine-born Lithuanian graphic artist
Raminta Elena Kuprevičienė (born 1938), paper restorer
Jolanta Kvašytė (born 1956), ceramist

L
Jovita Laurušaitė (born 1956), painter, ceramist
Violeta Laužonytė (born 1955), textile artist
Filomena Linčiūtė-Vaitiekūnienė (born 1942), set designer, painter

M
Marija Mačiulienė (born 1929), painter
Anortė Mackelaitė (born 1930), stained glass artist

O
Vita Opolskytė (born 1992), painter

P
Paulina Pukytė (born 1966), artist, writer
Grytė Pintukaitė (born 1977), painter portraitist

R
Eglė Rakauskaitė (born 1967), visual artist
Zofia Romer (1885–1972), Lithuanian-born Polish painter

S
Indrė Šerpytytė (born 1983), contemporary artist based in London
Esther Shalev-Gerz (born 1957), contemporary artist

T
Irena Trečiokaitė-Žebenkienė (1909–1985), painter

V
Sofija Veiverytė (1926–2009), monumental painter, educator

-
Lithuanian
Artists
Artists, Women